George Lovell is an 1847 novel by the Irish writer James Sheridan Knowles, published in three volumes. Sheridan Knowles had made his name writing stages plays, particularly tragedies such as Caius Gracchus and Virginius. He then turned to writing novels this was the second following the semi-autobiographical Fortescue (1846). His second novel focused on a series of adventures experienced by the son of a jeweller. Some reviewers found the novels too earnest in their tone. Both enjoyed more success in the United States that in Britain. Charlotte Brontë mentions the novel in one of her letters.

References

Bibliography
  Burwick, Frederick Goslee, Nancy Moore & Hoeveler Diane Long . The Encyclopedia of Romantic Literature. John Wiley & Sons,  2012.
 Gibson, Gertrude Gladys. James Sheridan Knowles and His Dramas. University of Iowa, 1930.
 Rollyson, Carl Edmund & Magill, Frank Northen. Critical Survey of Drama. Salem Press, 2003.
 Smith, Margaret (ed.) The Letters of Charlotte Brontë: 1848-1851. Clarendon, 1995 
Sutherland, John. The Longman Companion to Victorian Fiction. Routledge, 2014.

1847 British novels
19th-century Irish novels
Works by James Sheridan Knowles
Novels set in London